Lipschitz, Lipshitz, or Lipchitz, is an Ashkenazi Jewish (Yiddish/German-Jewish) surname. The surname has many variants, including: Lifshitz  (Lifschitz), Lifshits, Lifshuts, Lefschetz; Lipschitz, Lipshitz, Lipshits, Lopshits,  Lipschutz (Lipschütz), Lipshutz, Lüpschütz; Libschitz; Livshits; Lifszyc, Lipszyc. It is commonly Anglicized as Lipton, and less commonly as Lipington. 

There are several places in Europe from where the name may be derived. In all cases, Lip or Lib is derived from the Slavic root lipa (linden tree, see also Leipzig), and the itz ending is the Germanisation of the Slavic place name ending ice.

In the Czech Republic:

Libčice nad Vltavou (German: Libschitz an der Moldau) 
Liběšice u Litoměřic (German: Liebeschitz bei Leitmeritz)
Liběšice u Žatce (German: Libeschitz bei Saaz)

In Germany:

Gera-Liebschwitz
Liebschützberg-Liebschütz
Remptendorf-Liebschütz

In Poland:

Głubczyce (Silesian German: Lischwitz, German: Leobschütz)

In mathematics, the name can be used to describe a function that satisfies the Lipschitz condition, a strong form of continuity, named after Rudolf Lipschitz.

The surname may refer to:

People
 Daniel Lipšic, former Minister of Interior in Slovakia
 Israel Lipschitz (1782–1860), rabbi and biblical scholar 
 Jacques Lipchitz (1891–1973), Cubist sculptor
 Lippy Lipshitz (1903–1980), South African sculptor, painter and printmaker
 Rudolf Lipschitz (1832–1903), German mathematician
 Imre Lakatos, Hungarian philosopher, born as Imre Lipschitz
 Ralph Lauren, American fashion designer, born as Ralph Lifshitz
 Hal Linden, American actor, and television personality, born Harold Lipschitz
 Solomon Lefschetz (1884–1972), Russian–US mathematician
 Joachim Lipschitz, German politician

Fictional characters
 Dr. Werner P. Lipschitz, fictional character of the Rugrats series

Berlin subway station
 There is a subway station Lipschitzallee (Lipschitz Avenue) in Berlin, named after politician Joachim Lipschitz

Jewish surnames